The Queen's Award for Enterprise: Innovation (Technology) (2010) was awarded on 21 April 2010, by Queen Elizabeth II.

Recipients
The following organisations were awarded this year.

 ATB Morley Ltd of Stanningley, Pudsey, West Yorkshire for the design and manufacture of high voltage electric motors
 Chas. A. Blatchford & Sons Ltd of Basingstoke, Hampshire for development of energy-storing artificial feet.
 Brompton Bicycle Ltd of Brentford, Middlesex for folding bicycle designed for personal mobility.
 Camera Dynamics Ltd of Bury St Edmunds, Suffolk for engineering solutions for television camera support.
 Concateno of Abingdon, Oxfordshire for detection devices drug abuse.
 Contact Lens Precision Laboratories Ltd (trading as UltraVision CLPL) Leighton Buzzard, Bedfordshire KeraSoft contact lenses for irregular corneas and keratoconus.
 DANLERS Limited of Chippenham, Wiltshire  for electronic switches for the energy saving control for lighting, heating, ventilation and air-conditioning units.
 Data Connection Ltd (trading as Metaswitch Networks) of Enfield, Middlesex for MetaSphere telephony application server.
 Delcam plc of Birmingham for CADCAM software for the dental industry.
 Domo Limited of Segensworth, for Solo4 wireless video surveillance system.
 Douglas Equipment Limited of Cheltenham, for electrically powered aircraft deck handling devices.
 Dunphy Combustion Ltd of Rochdale, Lancashire Ultra low for nOx stage fuel air combustion technology.
 DuPont Microcircuit Materials of  Bristol for Solamet screen printable metallizations for crystalline silicon solar cells
 Dyecor Limited of Whitestone, Herefordshire for thermacor transportation system for diagnostic samples.
 Eckersley O'Callaghan Ltd of London N1 for design and development of structural glass.
 E-Tabs Limited of London NW9 for software solutions and services for automated reporting and graphical charting.
 Garford Farm Machinery of Peterborough or the InRow Weeder using vision analysis techniques.
 Halyard (M&I) Ltd of Salisbury, Wiltshire for marine exhaust silencing systems
 i2 Limited of Fulbourn, Cambridgeshire for intelligence-led operations platform.
 Integrated Display Systems Ltd of Wallsend, Tyne and Wear for belt tensioning system for power assisted steering.
 Makevale Group Ltd of Ware, Hertfordshire for non-carcinogenic acrylics for dentures, and medical grade bone cement material; optically clear acrylic powders, and acrylic bead powders.
 Malvern Instruments Ltd of Malvern, Worcestershire Zetasizer for nano analytical instrument for measuring particle properties.
 Mortimer Technology Ltd of Thatcham, Berkshire Development of the TORBED energy technologies.
 Multiclip Company Limited (trading as Vortok) of  Plymouth, Devon for  rail stressing roller
 Navtech Radar Ltd of Wantage, Oxfordshire for designs and manufacture of radar based sensors for security surveillance, industrial automation, and traffic sensing.
 Newtons4th Ltd of Loughborough, Leicestershire for power analysers for measuring electric power.
 ONELAN Limited of Henley-on-Thames, Oxfordshire for Net Top Boxes for converting displays into digital signage
 Oxford Instruments NanoScience of Abingdon, Oxfordshire for Triton200: cryogen-free dilution refrigerator with high field superconducting magnet.
 Reeves Wireline Technologies of Loughborough, Leicestershire for design, manufacture and support of geophysical logging equipment for oil and gas well surveys
 Joseph Rhodes Limited of Wakefield, for super plastic forming and diffusion bonding presses.
 S.R.A. Developments Ltd of Ashburton, Newton Abbot, Devon for ultrasonic haemostatic dissector for cutting soft tissue in surgery
 Salamander MooD Active Enterprise York (MooD Active Enterprise Business Unit) – architecture-driven software for business performance governance.
 SCIPAC Ltd of Sittingbourne, Kent for large scale production of human serum for transferrin.
 Simcyp Limited of Sheffield, South Yorkshire for modelling and simulation tools to evaluate medicines prior to human clinical trials.
 Surgical Innovations Limited of Leeds YelloPort for plus, a semi-disposable port access system.
 ThorpeGlen Limited of Ipswich, Suffolk for intercept and electronic monitoring solutions.
 Tickhill Engineering Co Ltd of Doncaster, South Yorkshire for vegetable packing machinery.
 Touch EMAS Ltd (trading as Touch Bionics) Livingston, Scotland for the i-LIMB Hand a bionic hand with articulating digits.

References

Queen's Award for Enterprise: Innovation (Technology)
2010 awards in the United Kingdom